Isabel Ge Mahe (born 1973/1974) is a Chinese businesswoman, and a vice president of Apple Inc., and managing director and head of its Greater China region.

Career
Before joining Apple, Mahe was vice president of wireless Software engineering at Palm Inc.

In 2008, Mahe joined Apple as vice president of wireless technologies.

In May 2017, Mahe was appointed managing director in charge of Apple's Greater China region.

In Fortune magazine's most powerful women international for 2017, Mahe was ranked #12.

Personal life
Mahe is married, with four children, and lives in Shanghai.

References

Apple Inc. executives
Simon Fraser University alumni
Living people
University of California, Berkeley alumni
Businesspeople from Shenyang
20th-century Chinese businesswomen
20th-century Chinese businesspeople
21st-century Chinese businesswomen
21st-century Chinese businesspeople
1970s births